Villerspitze is the name of two mountains in Tyrol, Austria:

 Hohe Villerspitze, 3,087 m
 Lüsener Villerspitze (also Lisenser Villerspitze), 3,026 m